Pretium Partners (Pretium) is an American alternative investment firm headquartered in New York City. The firms focuses on investments in residential real estate as well as Corporate and Structured Credit. 

In 2022, the firm was ranked by PERE (under Private Equity International) as the fifteenth largest Private Equity Real Estate firm based on total fundraising over the most recent five-year period. 

It is stated to have a portfolio of 85,000 homes as of late 2022 making it the second largest largest owner of single-family rental homes in the United States behind Invitation Homes.

The firm has attracted controversy for its strategy of buying up large number of homes then charging tenants with high rental fees while providing poor maintenance. It has also been accused of evicting tenants who cannot pay rent during the COVID-19 pandemic despite COVID-19 eviction moratoriums being placed by the Centers for Disease Control and Prevention (CDC).

Background 
Pretium was formed in 2012 by Donald Mullen who was a Partner at Goldman Sachs. Mullen was the head of Goldman Sachs’ mortgage and credit business and was one of the main architects behind the bet against the U.S. housing market in what became known as "The Big Short." The bet paid off and produced lucrative returns for Goldman Sachs after the Subprime mortgage crisis which caused the 2000s United States housing market correction.

In 2012, Pretium raised $1.2 billion for its first residential real estate fund named Progress Residential, L.P which was used to buy more than 16,500 homes at big discounts. The fund would fund the establishment of the company Progress Residential, which acts as a single-family rental (SFR) management services platform.

In 2014, Pretium raised $900 million for its second fund to purchase roughly 14,000 non-performing home loans.

In 2016, Pretium raised $1 billion for its third fund to buy single-family homes to rent out to tenants.

In October 2018, Pretium announced it would acquire mortgage loan servicing company Selene Finance LLP from Oaktree Capital Management and Ranieri Partners.

In 2019, Pretrium raised $2.5 billion in another fund for its single-family rental business with Landmark Partners partially funding it. In the same year, Pretium acquired non-qualified mortgage, Deephaven Mortgage from Värde Partners.

In February 2020,  Pretium acquired the investment management business of Latigo, fund manager that specialises in event-driven investing opportunities.

In January 2021, Pretium and Ares Management took NYSE listed landlord company, Front Yard Residential private for $2.5 billion. HavenBrook Homes which was part of Front Yard Residential also came under the control of Pretium. During the same month, Pretium and the Public Sector Pension Investment Board formed a $700 million joint venture to invest the retirement savings of most federal employees, to develop SFR housing in the U.S.

In September 2021, Pretrium and Crescent Communities set up a $1 billion joint venture to construct new homes that are built to rent.

In November 2021, Pretium acquired home-flipping lender Anchor Loans for $1.5 billion.

In January 2022, Pretium and Indianapolis-based builder Onyx+East formed a $600 million joint venture to develop rental homes.

In December 2022, Pretium opened a new office in Miami Beach.

Controversies

Washington Post coverage 
On December 15, 2021, The Washington Post profiled the Pretium in an article after its business plans and investors were revealed in the Pandora Papers.The plan sought to exploit the 2000s United States housing market correction that forced millions of homeowners into foreclosure leading to many cheap houses for sale. Pretium planned to acquire these houses and rent them to families who had lost their homes or could no longer qualify for a mortgage. Pretium send confidential invitations to investors who could contribute $2 million.  According to its solicitation documents in 2012, the plan was projected to have annualized returns of 15 to 20 percent. Pretrium raised more than $1 billion which allowed it to form Progress Residential. Notable investors include Charles and Stephen Bronfman of the Bronfman family and Vikrant Bhargava.  According to tax experts, Pretium made legal arrangements so such foreign investors would have limited exposure to U.S. taxes. However Pretium has stated its tax arrangement structured and managed in accordance with industry best practices. By 2019, according to Pretium's press release, its Progress Residential venture had nearly doubled investors' equity. Progress Residential has been stated to acquire as many as 2,000 houses a month using a computerized property-search algorithm and rapid all-cash offers.

The article also covered how families in Tammy Sue Lane in La Vergne, Tennessee, complained about how Progress Residential bought up most residential property and were treating occupants unfairly, providing poor maintenance and charging excessive rent fees. As housing prices were too high, they had no choice but to rent the houses under Progress Residential. Progress Residential has stated its fees adhere to basic industry standards. Complaints drew little attention until the COVID-19 pandemic where residents were evicted from their house if they were unable to pay rent despite the economic conditions and the COVID-19 eviction moratoriums issued by the CDC. Pretium has stated that no resident covered by a signed CDC declaration affirming their inability to pay their full rent has ever been evicted.

State lawsuit 
In early 2022, Minnesota Attorney General Keith Ellison sued HavenBrook Homes and its owner, Pretium for failing to maintain its properties and violating the statewide pandemic eviction moratorium.

References

External links
 

2012 establishments in New York City
Financial services companies established in 2012
Investment management companies of the United States
Privately held companies based in New York City
Real estate companies of the United States